Douglas Donizete Maia de Oliveira (born 12 April 1989), known as Douglas Maia, is a Brazilian professional footballer. Either a right back or midfielder, he can also play as a winger.

References

External links

1989 births
Living people
Sportspeople from Paraná (state)
Brazilian footballers
Association football defenders
Association football midfielders
Association football utility players
Campeonato Brasileiro Série A players
Campeonato Brasileiro Série C players
Club Athletico Paranaense players
Clube Atlético Bragantino players
Bonsucesso Futebol Clube players
Fluminense FC players
Clube Atlético Juventus players
Associação Portuguesa de Desportos players
Nacional Atlético Clube (SP) players
Esporte Clube Passo Fundo players
Belgian Pro League players
Oud-Heverlee Leuven players
Brazilian expatriate footballers
Brazilian expatriate sportspeople in Belgium
Expatriate footballers in Belgium